The following is a list of county roads in Pasco County, Florida.  All county roads are maintained by the county in which they reside.

County routes in Pasco County

References

FDOT Map of Pasco County, Florida
FDOT GIS data, accessed January 2014

 
County